39 Eridani is a wide binary star system in the equatorial constellation of Eridanus. It is visible to the naked eye as a faint, orange-hued star with a combined apparent visual magnitude of 4.87. As of 2015, the components had an angular separation of  along a position angle of 143°. The system is moving further from the Sun with a heliocentric radial velocity of +7 km/s.

The magnitude 5.07 primary, designated component A, is an aging giant star with a stellar classification of K3 III. This object is more than a billion years old with 1.77 times the mass of the Sun. With the hydrogen at its core exhausted, the star has expanded to 12 times the Sun's radius. It is a candidate super metal-rich star, showing a significant overabundance of iron compared to the Sun. 39 Eridani A is radiating 81.3 times the luminosity of the Sun from its swollen photosphere at an effective temperature of 4,641 K.

The secondary, component B, is a magnitude 8.68 G-type main-sequence star with a class of G2 V. It has 1.15 times the Sun's radius and shines with 1.37 times the luminosity of the Sun at an effective temperature of 5,816 K.

References 

K-type giants
G-type main-sequence stars
Eridanus (constellation)
Durchmusterung objects
Eridani, 39
026846
019777
1318
Binary stars